Pterygochiton is an extinct genus of polyplacophoran molluscs. Pterygochiton became extinct during the Carboniferous period.

References 

Prehistoric chiton genera